Austromordella tarsata is a species of beetle in the genus Austromordella. It was described in 1950.

References

Mordellinae
Beetles described in 1950